Thirteen ships of the French navy have borne the name Renommée ("Renown"):

Ships named Renommée 
 , a light 1-gun frigate.
 , a frigate.
 , a galley.
 , a galley.
 , a galley.
 , a 48-gun ship of the line.
 , a 40-gun frigate.
 , a 4-gun cutter.
 , a 32-gun  frigate, bore the name Renommée during her career.
 , a 64-gun  ship of the line, bore the name Renommée during her career.
 , was a 40-gun  that the Royal Navy captured in 1811 and renamed ; the  captured her in 1813 and subsequently burnt her.
 , a frigate, converted to sail and steam propulsion in 1857.

See also

Citations and references
Citations

References
 

French Navy ship names